My Name Up in Lights is The Secret Handshake's third full-length studio album. It was released on April 29, 2009 on Triple Crown Records. Luis Dubuc began writing songs for My Name Up in Lights immediately after he finished One Full Year and eventually ended with 60 songs to choose from for his follow-up album. Dubuc wrote, played, recorded, programmed and produced the whole record himself in his home studio.

The album reached #17 on the Billboard Heatseekers chart and #45 on the Independent Albums chart.

Track listing
 "All for You"
 "TGIF"
 "Nothing Can Change That"
 "Little Song"
 "What's Wrong"
 "Saturday"
 "Make Up Your Mind"
 "Hey Girl"
 "Brand New Love"
 "Last Song"
iTunes bonus tracks:
<li> "Better Off Alone" (Alice DeeJay cover)
<li> "Make Up Your Mind" (Remix feat. Random Impulse)

References

External links
My Name Up in Lights on SmartPunk
The Secret Handshake on purevolume
My Name Up in Lights on Absolutepunk

2009 albums
Triple Crown Records albums